Sixpenny Corner was the UK's first daily TV soap opera, broadcast by ITV from September 1955 until June 1956. The programme was created by Jonquil Antony and Hazel Adair; the latter later co-created Crossroads. The 15-minute episodes centred on a recently married young couple, Bill and Sally Norton, played by Howard Pays and Patricia Dainton. The setting was the fictional rural town of Springwood, where Bill ran a small garage business at Sixpenny Corner.

All of the 181 episodes are lost.

Cast
The cast includes:

Patricia Dainton
Howard Pays
Robert Webber
Betty Bowden
Robert Desmond
Shirley Mitchell
Stuart Saunders
Olive Milbourne
Walter Horsbrugh
Christine Pollon
Elizabeth Gott
Edward Judd
Vi Stevens
Bernard Fox
Laurence Shiel
Seymour Green
Jan Miller
Mysie Monte

References

External links

1950s British television soap operas
1955 British television series debuts
1956 British television series endings
British television soap operas
Lost television shows
Black-and-white British television shows
English-language television shows
Television shows produced by Associated-Rediffusion